Carol Schlosberg (14 June 1957 – 29 March 1998) was an American painter who was born in Newton, Massachusetts, and had been an art instructor at Yale University where she earned her Master of Fine Arts in 1992.  She was a resident of Vermont at the time of her death.

During her brief career, she was known for abstract works that have been described as "textured, abstract, sometimes geometric, sometimes free-form." Her career was cut short when she was murdered during a vacation trip to Mexico in 1998.

Career
Schlosberg initially studied painting at Montserrat College of Art in Beverly, Massachusetts, where her teachers included painter George Gabin. In 1989 she received a fellowship to study at the Yale Norfolk Summer School of Music and Art in Norfolk, Connecticut. She subsequently pursued a graduate degree at Yale University, where she studied with William Bailey, Gregory Amernoff, Andrew Forge, Natalie Charkow and Richard Lytle. Schlosberg earned an M.F.A. from Yale in 1992. After her study at Yale, she exhibited throughout the region.

Death
On 29 March 1998, Schlosberg was murdered while vacationing in the resort town of Puerto Escondido, Mexico. Her murder was among the most highly publicized murders of an American in Mexico of its era.  The New York Times described the murder as part of a "crime epidemic" then sweeping Mexico.  It was the subject of a report on the ABC television news program "20/20" on 27 April 1998.

Two men, one "a Mexican construction worker with a previous conviction for raping a foreign tourist," and the other "a drifter" were convicted of her murder.

After her death, her life and artistic career were recognized by Montserrat College of Art, which named the Carol Schlosberg Gallery in her honor.

References

Sources
 "Mexicans Convicted of Artsist Death," Associated Press (6 October 1999). 
 "The Dangers of Traveling in Mexico," Corporate Travel Safety.  (Retrieved 23 May 2012.)

External links
 Carol Schlosberg Memorial Site 

1957 births
1998 deaths
American women painters
Yale University alumni
People murdered in Mexico
20th-century American painters
20th-century American women artists
Artists from Newton, Massachusetts
Painters from Massachusetts
Montserrat College of Art alumni